Anna Pardo Perarnau (born November 18, 1983) is a former Spanish water polo player 
who won the silver medal at the 2008 European Championship held in Málaga, Spain.

College career

Pardo attended University of Southern California, playing on the women's water polo team from 2003 to 2005. As a freshman, she scored a team-high three goals in an 8–7 overtime win against Stanford in the MPSF Championship match. In May 2004 she won the NCAA by defeating Loyola Marymount 10–8.

References

Spanish female water polo players
Living people
1983 births
Water polo players from Barcelona
USC Trojans women's water polo players